Gisela Dulko won her first WTA Tour singles title, defeating Sorana Cîrstea in the final, 6–7(2–7), 6–2, 6–2 to capture the Women's Singles tennis championship at the 2007 Hungarian Ladies Open.

Anna Smashnova was the two-time defending champion, but she chose not to compete this year.

Seeds

Draw

Finals

Section 1

Section 2

Qualifying

Seeds

Qualifiers

Lucky loser

First qualifier

Second qualifier

Third qualifier

Fourth qualifier

References

Hungarian Ladies Open - Singles
Budapest Grand Prix
Lad